Notostylopidae is an extinct family comprising five genera of notoungulate mammals known from the Late Paleocene (Riochican) to Early Oligocene (Tinguirirican) of Argentina, Brazil and Chile in South America

References

Notoungulates
Prehistoric mammal families
Paleogene mammals of South America
Eocene first appearances
Rupelian extinctions
Taxa named by Florentino Ameghino